Robuck is a given name. Notable people with the name include:

Robuck French, 16th-century Irish politician
Robuck Lynch, 15th-century Irish politician